In mathematical finite group theory, the L-balance theorem was proved by .
The letter L stands for the layer of a group, and "balance" refers to the property discussed below.

Statement

The L-balance theorem of Gorenstein and Walter  states that if X is a finite group and T a  2-subgroup of X then

Here L2′(X)  stands for the 2-layer of a group X, which is the product of all the 2-components of the group, the minimal subnormal subgroups of X mapping onto components of X/O(X).

A consequence is that if a and b are commuting involutions of a group G then

This is the property called L-balance.

More generally similar results are true if the prime 2 is replaced by a prime p, and in this case the condition is called Lp-balance, but the proof of this requires the classification of finite simple groups (more precisely the Schreier conjecture).

References

Theorems about finite groups